José Fernando Ferreira Pinto (born 7 November 1939, in Benguela, Portuguese Angola) is a retired Portuguese footballer who played as a midfielder.

External links

1939 births
Living people
People from Benguela
Portuguese sportspeople of Angolan descent
Portuguese footballers
Association football midfielders
Primeira Liga players
Sporting CP footballers
G.D. Fabril players
S.L. Benfica footballers
U.F.C.I. Tomar players
Portugal international footballers
Black Portuguese sportspeople